The Zone of Death is the  area in the Idaho section of Yellowstone National Park  in which, as a result of a reported loophole in the Constitution of the United States, a person could theoretically avoid conviction for any major crime, up to and including murder.

Loophole
The United States District Court for the District of Wyoming is currently the only United States district court to have jurisdiction over parts of multiple states. This is because its jurisdiction includes all of Yellowstone National Park, which extends slightly beyond Wyoming's boundaries into Idaho and Montana.  In addition, the federal government has exclusive jurisdiction over the park, so crimes committed in the park cannot be prosecuted under any of the states' laws.

Trials in the district court are normally held at the federal courthouse in Cheyenne, Wyoming. However, the Sixth Amendment to the United States Constitution decrees that juries in federal criminal cases must be made up of citizens who are from both the district  state where the crime was committed. Because of this, charges for a crime alleged to have been committed in the area of the park in Idaho would have to be tried before a jury consisting entirely of residents of that area, and the trial would also have to take place in that area. As the Idaho portion of the park is uninhabited, a jury of residents of both the state and district could not be empaneled. As the Constitution guarantees the right to a jury trial, specified three separate times (Article III, Section 2; 6th Amendment; 7th Amendment), a defendant facing any felony or misdemeanor charge, being unable to receive a constitutional trial, could not be legally punished regardless of guilt or innocence.

Discovery
The constitutional loophole in this area was discovered by Michigan State University law professor Brian C. Kalt while he was planning to write an essay about technicalities of the Sixth Amendment, which entitles criminal defendants to a fair and quick trial. Kalt wondered about a hypothetical place where there were not enough eligible citizens to form a jury and theorized that there could be no trial and therefore no punishment for major crimes in that area. He later realized that there was such a place: the Idaho section of Yellowstone National Park. Horrified by his realization, Kalt shifted his focus to writing an essay about the area to persuade the government to fix the loophole. The essay, which is called "The Perfect Crime", was published in 2005 in The Georgetown Law Journal. Kalt feared that criminals might read the essay and commit a crime in the Zone before the loophole was fixed.

History
After Kalt discovered the loophole, he worked to have Congress close it. He suggested to lawmakers in Wyoming that the Zone of Death be included as part of the federal district court for the District of Idaho instead of the Wyoming district, which would fix the issue. However, Congress ignored Kalt's suggestion. In 2007, author C. J. Box wrote a novel called Free Fire that featured the Zone, which Box hoped would increase governmental awareness. The novel did succeed in alerting Wyoming Senator Mike Enzi to the issue. However, Enzi was unable to convince Congress to discuss it.

No known felonies have been committed in the Zone of Death since Kalt's discovery. However, a poacher named Michael Belderrain illegally shot an elk in the Montana section of Yellowstone. While that section of the park does have enough residents to form a jury, it might be difficult to put together a standing and fair one due to travel or unwillingness of members of the small population there to serve. A federal judge ruled that Belderrain could be tried in the U.S. District Court for the District of Wyoming, despite the Sixth Amendment problem. Belderrain cited Kalt's paper "The Perfect Crime" to explain why he believed it was illegal to have his trial with a jury from a state other than where the crime was committed. The court dismissed this argument. Belderrain took a plea deal conditioned such that he would not appeal the Zone of Death issue to the 10th Circuit, rendering the issue moot, at least for the time being.

Works of fiction
 Population Zero, a 2016 mockumentary about a murder in the area.
 In the TV series Yellowstone, enemies of the Dutton family are taken across the border into Wyoming and are executed and disposed of "at the train station". It is implied that the rules of the "Zone of Death" apply to this practice, including the location's juxtaposition with "three States" (Montana, Wyoming, and Idaho) and the lack of ability to prosecute crimes:

 "This is America," a 2019 episode of ABC legal drama For The People.
 The main plot of the novel Free Fire written by C. J. Box centers on four murders that occur in the Zone of Death.

See also
 Federal enclave
 Bir Tawil

References

Fremont County, Idaho
United States Sixth Amendment case law
Yellowstone National Park
2005 neologisms